Flud was a social news reader application for iPad, iPhone, Android and Windows Phone. It was designed to display RSS feeds from blogs and news sites into individual streams for easy viewing. In Flud, articles and stories could be stored for later reading with the Reading List, shared as a favorite read with the Flud button, and shared with Facebook, Twitter, email, Tumblr, Instapaper, and ReadItLater. Flud was headquartered in the historic Spreckels Theater Building in San Diego, California, with remote offices in Detroit and Chicago.

Flud had been tagged as "the first true social news reader" where users could create a personal profile, follow others who share their interests, and become influencers to their followers by sharing content (known as Fluding).

On August 8, 2013, Flud was discontinued.

Features 
 Create a profile  to display profile image, username, followers, following, most read sources, number of Fluded and Reading List articles.
 Activity Feed  shows what a user's followers are reading and fluding.
 Add, reorder, edit category, or remove feeds.
 Pre-loaded featured feeds for adding and browsing.
 Connect to other users   with similar interests in news, blogs and topics.
 Flud  favorite articles.
 Most Fluded feed displays the articles most fluded by users.
 Connect to Tumblr, Google Reader, Twitter, Facebook, Read It Later, Instapaper and email.
 Create a Reading List of interesting headlines.
 Access to Reading List when offline.
 Play video, view images, read stories.
 Account preferences transfer across devices.

History 
Flud started as a secret sauce project in the summer of 2010 between Bobby Ghoshal and Matthew Ausonio, cofounders of Made By Rabbit, Inc., a startup out of San Diego, California. Flud 1.0 for the iPad hit the iOS App Store in August 2010 and was made available for the iPhone in the following months.

Soon after the initial launch of Flud 1.0, Fast Company distinguished Flud's iPad user interface as the "Best UI Design of 2010", NBC called Flud the “future of news” and Mashable distinguished Flud as 1 of 3 news readers actively changing and innovating the news industry.

Flud received $1 million in seed funding in April 2011 and became available on Android mobile devices in August 2011.

In December 2011, Flud 2.0 hit the App Store as a new type of social news reader, allowing users to create their own news personalities and become a trusted source on topical interests. Major changes included the addition of social features, an updated user interface design, and Tumblr support. Flud 2.0 launched on Windows Phone and Android devices in March 2012.

On August 8, 2013, the Flud service was discontinued. Users had until that date to download all their data.

References 

2010 software
Android (operating system) software
IOS software